José María Sicilia (born 1954) is a Spanish abstractionist painter who currently resides in Paris and Sóller.

Background 
Sicilia was born in Madrid and grew up in Francoist Spain. He spent his holidays in the monastery town of Escorial near the Sierra de Guadarrama. In 1975 he joined the School of Fine Arts of San Fernando in Madrid. In 1980 he moved to Paris, where he first exhibited, and in 1985 he relocated to New York, where he became a close friend of the composer John Cage.  His early work displayed an Expressionist tendency. During the 1980s he was hailed as one of the most prestigious young Spanish artists.
He is known for his paintings of nature, including landscapes, insects and flowers. He has spent a large amount of time travelling in such countries as Tangier, Syria, Egypt, Morocco and India and his work is inspired by his sojourns. He is  renowned for his unusual techniques such as the use of wax with lithography.

Reviewing an exhibition at the Queens Museum of Art, The New York Times noted "Jose Maria Sicilia's paintings are... refined and very seductive. His waxen surfaces create delicate plays of light and shadow. Objects appear like auras or afterimages through the translucent veneers." He has displayed at the Musee d’Art Contemporain (Bordeaux, 2001), Musee des Beaux-Arts (Caen, 2000), Venice Biennale (1986), Centro Atlantico de Arte Moderno, Gran Canaria and Mohamed Mahmoud Khalil Museum, Cairo.  He also held multiple exhibitions in Japan, first in 1988, based in galleries in Nagasaki, Kyoto, Tokyo and most recently in Fukushima, in the wake of the 2011 tsunami and earthquake in the area.
In 1989 he received the National Award for Plastic Arts from the Spanish Ministry of Culture.

Collections 

Sicilia's work can be found in the following collections:

 CAAM, Centro Atlántico de Arte Moderno, Las Palmas de Gran Canaria 
 CAPC Musée d'Art Contemporain, Bourdeaux 
 Centro Andaluz de Arte Contemporáneo, Sevilla
 Cincinnati Art Museum, Cincinnati, Ohio
 Colección Banco de España, Madrid  
 Colección Arte Contemporáneo Fundación La Caixa, Barcelona
 Colección Comunidad de Madrid, Madrid
 Colección Fundesco, Madrid
 Collecció Testimoni de La Caixa, Barcelona 
 FRAC (Fonds Régionaux d'Art Contemporani), Midi Pyrenées
 Fundació Museu d'Art Contemporani, Barcelona
 IVAM, Centre Julio González, Valencia
 Meessen De Clercq, Brussels, Belgium. 
 Musée d'Art Contemporain, Toulouse
 Musée d'Art Moderne et la Création
 Museo Extremeño Iberoamericano de Arte Español Contemporáneo, Badajoz
 Museo Marugame Hirai de Arte Español Contemporáneo, Marugame
 Museo Nacional Centro de Arte Reina Sofía, Madrid
 Museo de Santa Cruz, Toledo
 Museum of Modern Art, New York
 Guggenheim, New York

References

Further reading 
 "La deconstrucción poética de las vanguardias abstractas en la pintura de José María Sicilia (1985-1987)" Kristian Leahy Brajnovic,  issue 18-19 (2005) Inicio

External links 
 "José Maria Sicilia", La Pensée du Midi 2003/3-1 (issue 11)  
 Picasso Mio Biography and work

Living people
1954 births
Spanish painters
Abstract expressionist artists
Artists from Madrid
Spanish contemporary artists